The Rural Municipality of Hazel Dell No. 335 is a rural municipality (RM) in the Canadian province of Saskatchewan within Census Division No. 9 and  Division No. 4.

History 
The RM of Hazel Dell No. 335 incorporated as a rural municipality on January 1, 1913.

Geography

Communities and localities 

The following urban municipalities are surrounded by the RM.

Villages
 Lintlaw

The following unincorporated communities are within the RM.

Organized hamlets
 Hazel Dell
 Okla

Localities
 Lone Spruce
 Rockford
 Stove Creek

Demographics 

Attractions 
 Porcupine Provincial Forest

Government 
The RM of Hazel Dell No. 335 is governed by an elected municipal council and an appointed administrator that meets on the second Wednesday of every month. The reeve of the RM is Randall Harriman while its administrator is Michael Rattray. The RM's office is located in Okla.

Transportation 
 Saskatchewan Highway 49
 Saskatchewan Highway 617
 Saskatchewan Highway 753
 Saskatchewan Highway 755

See also 
List of rural municipalities in Saskatchewan

References 

H

Division No. 9, Saskatchewan